The Hôtel des Invalides, commonly called Les Invalides, is a complex of buildings in the 7th arrondissement of Paris, France, containing museums and monuments, all relating to the military history of France, as well as a hospital and a retirement home for war veterans, the building's original purpose. The buildings house the Musée de l'Armée, the military museum of the Army of France, the Musée des Plans-Reliefs, and the Musée d'Histoire Contemporaine. The latter has been converted into a shrine of some of France's leading military figures, most notably the tomb of Napoleon.

History 
 

Louis XIV initiated the project by an order dated 24 November 1670, as a home and hospital for aged and disabled soldiers. The initial architect of Les Invalides was Libéral Bruant. The selected site was in the then suburban plain of Grenelle (plaine de Grenelle). By the time the enlarged project was completed in 1676, the façade fronting the Seine measured  in width, and the complex had fifteen courtyards, the largest being the cour d'honneur designed for military parades. 

Several projects were submitted in the mid-1660s by both Mansart and Gian Lorenzo Bernini who was residing in Paris at the time. Mansart's second project is very close to Hardouin-Mansart's concept of the Royal Chapel or Dome Church at Les Invalides, both in terms of its architecture and of its relationship with the adjacent church. Architectural historian Allan Braham has hypothesized that the domed chapel was initially intended to be a new burial place for the Bourbon Dynasty, but that project was not implemented. Instead, the massive building was designated as private chapel of the monarch, from which he could attend church service without having to mingle with the disabled veterans. It was barely used for that purpose.

The interior of the dome was painted by Le Brun's disciple Charles de La Fosse with a Baroque illusionistic ceiling painting. The painting was completed in 1705.

Meanwhile, Hardouin-Mansart assisted the aged Bruant on the chapel, which was finished to Bruant's design after the latter's death in 1697. This chapel is known as the church of Saint-Louis-des-Invalides. Daily attendance of the veterans in the church services was required. The Dome chapel was finished in 1706. 

Because of its location and significance, the Invalides served as the scene for several key events in French history. On 14 July 1789 it was stormed by Parisian rioters who seized the cannons and muskets stored in its cellars to use against the Bastille later the same day. Napoleon was entombed under the Dome of the Invalides with great ceremony in 1840.

The separation between the two churches was reinforced in the 19th century with the erection of Napoleon's tomb, the creation of the two separate altars and then with the construction of a glass wall between the two chapels.

The building retained its primary function of a retirement home and hospital for military veterans (invalides) until the early twentieth century. In 1872 the musée d'artillerie (Artillery Museum) was located within the building to be joined by the musée historique des armées (Historical Museum of the Armies) in 1896. The two institutions were merged to form the present musée de l'armée in 1905. At the same time the veterans in residence were dispersed to smaller centres outside Paris. The reason was that the adoption of a mainly conscript army, after 1872, meant a substantial reduction in the numbers of veterans having the twenty or more years of military service formerly required to enter the Hôpital des Invalides. The building accordingly became too large for its original purpose. The modern complex does however still include the facilities detailed below for about a hundred elderly or incapacitated former soldiers.

When the Army Museum at Les Invalides was founded in 1905, the veterans' chapel was placed under its administrative control. It is now the cathedral of the Diocese of the French Armed Forces, officially known as Cathédrale Saint-Louis-des-Invalides.

Architecture

On the north front of Les Invalides, Hardouin-Mansart's Dome chapel is large enough to dominate the long façade, yet harmonizes with Bruant's door under an arched pediment. To the north, the courtyard (cour d'honneur) is extended by a wide public esplanade (Esplanade des Invalides) where the embassies of Austria and Finland are neighbors of the French Ministry of Foreign Affairs, all forming one of the grand open spaces in the heart of Paris. At its far end, the Pont Alexandre III links this grand urbanistic axis with the Petit Palais and the Grand Palais. The Pont des Invalides is next, downstream the Seine river.

The buildings still comprise the Institution Nationale des Invalides, a national institution for disabled war veterans. The institution comprises:
a retirement home
a medical and surgical centre
a centre for external medical consultations.

Gallery

Burials

The Dome chapel became a military necropolis when Napoleon in September 1800 designated it for the relocation of the tomb of Louis XIV's celebrated general Turenne, followed in 1807–1808 by Vauban. In 1835, the underground gallery below the church received the remains of 14 victims of the Giuseppe Marco Fieschi's failed assassination attempt on Louis-Philippe I. The major development came with the building's designation to become Napoleon's tomb by a law of 10 June 1840, as part of the political project of the  orchestrated by king Louis-Philippe I and his minister Adolphe Thiers (the reference to Napoleon's  or "ashes" is actually to his mortal remains, as he had not been cremated). The creation of the crypt and of Napoleon's massive sarcophagus took twenty years to complete and was finished in 1861. By then, it was emperor Napoleon III who was in power and oversaw the ceremony of the transfer of his remains from a chapel of the church to the crypt beneath the dome.

Inside the Dome church

The most notable tomb at Les Invalides is that of Napoleon Bonaparte (1769–1821), designed by Louis Visconti with sculptures by James Pradier, Pierre-Charles Simart and Francisque Joseph Duret. Napoleon was initially interred on Saint Helena, but King Louis Philippe arranged for his remains to be brought to France in 1840, an event known as le retour des cendres. Napoléon's remains were kept in the Saint Jerome (southwestern) chapel of the Dome church for more than two decades until his final resting place, a tomb made of red quartzite and resting on a green granite base, was finished in 1861.

Other military figures and members of Napoleon's family also buried at the Dome church, by year of burial there:
 1800: Henri de La Tour d'Auvergne, Viscount of Turenne (1611–1675); 1670s monument by Gaspard Marsy and Jean-Baptiste Tuby, originally at the Basilica of Saint-Denis and relocated by Napoleon 
 1807–1808: heart of Sébastien Le Prestre de Vauban (1633–1707); relocated by Napoleon from Bazoches, replaced in 1847 with a cenotaph by Antoine Étex
 1847: Henri Gatien Bertrand (1773–1844), army general who accompanied Napoleon to Elba and then St Helena, and in 1840 brought Napoleon's body back to France; monument designed by Louis Visconti
 1847: Géraud Duroc (1772–1813); also by Louis Visconti
 1862: Jérôme Bonaparte (1784–1860), Napoleon's youngest brother, Governor of the Invalides 1848–1852; monument by Alfred-Nicolas Normand with sculpture by Eugène Guillaume, in the Saint Jerome chapel
 Charles Leclerc (1772–1802); urn relocated from the Château de Montgobert
 1904: heart of Théophile Corret de la Tour d'Auvergne (1743–1800), named by Napoleon the "first grenadier of the Republic"
 1940: Napoleon II (1811–1832) son of Napoleon (his heart and intestines remained in Vienna); first placed in the church's Saint Jerome Chapel, then buried in the crypt in 1969
 1858: heart of Catharina of Württemberg (1783–1835), wife of Jérôme Bonaparte, and their son Jérôme Napoléon Charles Bonaparte, in the underground gallery; the monument of Catharina's heart was relocated in 1862 in the Saint Jerome Chapel
 1937: Ferdinand Foch (1851–1929), monument by Paul Landowski in the Saint Ambrose (northeastern) chapel
 1963: Hubert Lyautey (1854–1934), relocated from Morocco, monument by Albert Laprade in the Saint Gregory (northwestern) chapel

Under the Cathedral church

82 additional military figures, including 28 Governors of Les Invalides, are in the underground gallery known as the  beneath the Saint-Louis Cathedral:
 Albert d'Amade (1856–1941)
 Jean-Toussaint Arrighi de Casanova (1778–1853), Governor 1852–1853
 Louis Baraguey d'Hilliers (1764–1813) (heart)
 Achille Baraguey d'Hilliers (1795–1878), Marshal of France
 Jean-François Berruyer (1737?–1804), Governor 1803–1804
 Jean-Baptiste Bessières (1768–1813), Marshal of the Empire
 Baptiste Pierre Bisson (1767–1811) (heart)
 Antoine Baucheron de Boissoudy (1864–1926)
 Thomas Bugeaud (1784–1849), Marshal of France, involved in the conquest of Algeria
 François Canrobert (1809–1895), Marshal of France
 François-Henri de Franquetot de Coigny (1737–1821), Marshal of France, Governor 1816–1821
 Victor Cordonnier (1858–1936)
 Charles-Marie Denys de Damrémont (1783–1837)
 Vincent Martel Deconchy (1768–1823) (heart)
 Denis Auguste Duchêne (1862–1950)
 Guy-Victor Duperré (1775–1846)
  (1794–1848)
 Jean Baptiste Eblé (1758–1812) (heart)
 Louis Franchet d'Espèrey (1856–1942), Marshal of France
 Rémy Joseph Isidore Exelmans (1775–1852), Marshal of France
 Émile Fayolle (1852–1928), Marshal of France
 Ernest François Fournier (1842–1934)
 Dominique-Marie Gauchet (1853–1931)
 Augustin Gérard (1857–1926)
 Henri Giraud (1879–1949)
 Émile Guépratte (1856–1939)
 Adolphe Guillaumat (1863–1940)
 Ferdinand-Alphonse Hamelin (1796–1864)
 Jean-Joseph Ange d'Hautpoul (1754–1807) (heart)
 Paul Prosper Henrys (1862–1943)
  (1885–1960), Governor 1951–1960
 Georges Louis Humbert (1862–1921)
 Jean-Baptiste Jourdan (1762–1833), Marshal of the Empire, Governor 1830–1833
 Alphonse Juin (1888–1967), Marshal of France
 Jean-Baptiste Kléber (1753–1800) (heart)
 Fernand de Langle de Cary (1849–1927)
 Charles Lanrezac (1852–1925)
 Augustin Boué de Lapeyrère (1852–1924)
 Jean Ambroise Baston de Lariboisière (1759–1812)
 Dominique Jean Larrey (1766–1842), celebrated military surgeon
 Antoine Charles Louis de Lasalle (1777–1809), the "Hussar General"
 Philippe Leclerc de Hauteclocque (1902–1947), Marshal of France
 Patrice de MacMahon (1808–1893), Marshal of France and President of France
 Paul Maistre (1858–1922)
 Gabriel Malleterre (1858–1923), Governor 1919–1923
 Charles Mangin (1866–1925)
  (1864–1944), Governor 1923–1944
 Edmond-Charles de Martimprey (1808–1883), Governor 1870–1871
 Louis de Maud'huy (1857–1921)
 Michel-Joseph Maunoury (1847–1923), posthumous Marshal of France
 Antoine de Mitry (1857–1924)
 Gabriel Jean Joseph Molitor (1770–1849), Marshal of France, Governor 1847–1848
 Bon-Adrien Jeannot de Moncey (1754–1842), Marshal of the Empire, Governor 1833–1842
 Raoul Magrin-Vernerey a.k.a. Ralph Monclar (1892–1964), Governor 1862–1864
 Georges Mouton (1770–1838), Marshal of France
 François-Marie-Casimir Négrier (1788–1848) (heart)
 Robert Nivelle (1856–1924)
  (1618–1705), Governor 1696–1705
 Philippe Antoine d'Ornano (1784–1863), Marshal of France, Governor 1853–1863
 Nicolas Oudinot (1767–1847), Marshal of the Empire, Governor 1842–1847
 Paul Pau (1848–1932)
 Aimable Pélissier (1794–1864), Marshal of France
 Henri Putz (1859–1925)
  (1870–1951), Governor 1944–1951
 Pierre Alexis Ronarc'h (1865–1940)
 Pierre Roques (1856–1920), creator of the French Air Force
 Claude Joseph Rouget de Lisle (1760–1836), army captain, author of France's national anthem La Marseillaise
 Pierre Ruffey (1851–1928)
 Auguste Regnaud de Saint-Jean d'Angély (1794–1870), Marshal of France
 Jacques Leroy de Saint-Arnaud (1798–1854), Marshal of France
 Maurice Sarrail (1856–1929)
 Horace François Bastien Sébastiani de La Porta (1771–1851), Marshal of France
 Jean-Mathieu-Philibert Sérurier (1742–1819), Marshal of France, Governor 1804–1815
 Victor d'Urbal (1858–1943)
 Sylvain Charles Valée (1773–1846), Marshal of France

Two of these, Gabriel Malleterre and Philippe Leclerc de Hauteclocque, are also honored with a plaque inside the Saint-Louis-des-Invalides cathedral. Another plaque honors Jean de Lattre de Tassigny (1889–1952), posthumous Marshal of France, commander of the French First Army during World War II and later commander in the First Indochina War, who is buried in Mouilleron-en-Pareds.

See also

 List of museums in Paris
 List of hospitals in France
 List of tallest structures in Paris
 List of tallest domes
 Military history of France
 San Francisco City Hall, the design of which was influenced by Les Invalides
 La Tour-Maubourg, adjacent Paris Metro stop convenient to Les Invalides
 National Pantheon of Venezuela
 Buenos Aires Metropolitan Cathedral
 National Pantheon of the Heroes
 Altar de la Patria
 Artigas Mausoleum
 List of works by James Pradier
 History of early modern period domes

References

External links

 3d model of interior of Les Invalides

Buildings and structures completed in 1676
Baroque buildings in France
Monuments and memorials in Paris
Cemeteries in Paris
Veterans' affairs in France
Military-related organizations
Roman Catholic churches in the 7th arrondissement of Paris
Napoleon museums
Terminating vistas in Paris
Burial sites of the House of la Tour d'Auvergne
Burial sites of the House of Bonaparte
1676 establishments in France
Venues of the 2024 Summer Olympics
Olympic archery venues
Domes
Cathedrals of military ordinariates